The Death Valley '49ers were a group of pioneers from the Eastern United States that endured a long and difficult journey during the late 1840s California Gold Rush to prospect in the Sutter's Fort area of the Central Valley and Sierra Nevada in California. Their route from Utah went through the Great Basin Desert in Nevada, and Death Valley and the Mojave Desert in Southern California, in attempting to reach the Gold Country.

Journey to California

The Gold Rush

On January 24, 1848, James W. Marshall and his crew found gold at Sutter's Mill in Coloma, California. This discovery would lure tens of thousands of people from the United States and foreign nations. People packed their belongings and began to travel by covered wagon to what they hoped would be new and better life. Since the first great influx of these pioneers began in 1849, they are generally referred to as 49ers. However, the Donner Party pioneers had provided a sobering lesson after mis-scheduling the overland trip to California in 1846–47. Those pioneers had started late and elected to follow the Hastings Cutoff, a new route which slowed the group, and they reached the Sierra Nevada late in fall 1846. There, a storm trapped them in the mountains, resulting in the infamous disaster.

The stories of the Donner Party were still fresh on everyone's mind when a group of wagons arrived at Salt Lake City and organized in early fall 1849. This was too late in the season to reach and cross the Sierra Nevada without risk of being similarly trapped, so it appeared the group would have to wait out the winter in Salt Lake City. They heard about the Old Spanish Trail, a route that went around the south end of the Sierra and was safe to travel in the winter. It was not certain if wagons could negotiate the route, but some had recently headed for the trail to try, so the group found a guide by name of Jefferson Hunt who had previously traveled the route in 1847 and agreed to lead them.  These individuals would become part of a story of human suffering in a place which they named Death Valley.

Hunt starts out

The 107 wagons that would start the journey were scattered about the Salt Lake City area, and Hunt advised the wagon train should organize into seven divisions, each led by a captain, with Hunt in overall command. Each division would spend a day leading the rest of the group, breaking the road and preparing the way for the rest, then falling to the rear the next day; with seven divisions, each would lead the journey once a week. In addition, Hunt instructed the group to wait a few more days before departing, as cooler weather would prevail during the southern route's path through the desert. The group's constitution was drafted and accepted on September 30, 1849.

The first several days of travel from their gathering point at Hobble Creek (near present-day Provo, Utah) went well at first. The southern route closely follows the present course of Interstate 15 to reach the Spanish Trail, which diverges from I-15 near present-day Parowan. On October 9, the group reached the Sevier River and continued but were delayed repeatedly for illness and tribunals.

He had previously traveled up the Spanish Trail from California with Porter Rockwell, and Rockwell had left the trail west of where it intersected the I-15 corridor and taken a different route, presumably reducing the distance. Instead, Hunt led the party west down the Beaver River, to present day Minersville, Utah, where they camped for two nights to rest and prepare for a long stretch with no water. They then turned south and traveled  on October 21 and made a dry camp. Hunt assumed that he would come across Coal Creek (near present-day Cedar City), where the group could rest. However, Hunt continued southwest across the Escalante Desert without locating a water source; While the group waited, they ended up driving their stock back to the river for water. Hunt ultimately failed to find water, nearly dying from thirst during the attempt, and the party ended up turning back.

The parties split up

The group's patience and confidence in Hunt was diminished by the gaffe at the Beaver River, and while in camp recovering, a pack train group led by Orson K. Smith and Charles C. Rich rode in on October 22 and joined the larger group temporarily; Smith showed a map made by Elijah Barney Ward, a former trapper who had trailed stolen horses from California over Walker Pass, which showed a route west across the Escalante Desert to Walker Pass. According to an alternate account, a map had been shown by Mr. Williams while the group was still in Salt Lake City; the Williams cut-off led to Owens Lake, and at least one group had a copy of the Williams map. Yet another alternate account stated the map was a copy of one made by John C. Fremont during his military campaign in 1845. After backtracking, the group continued down the I-15 corridor over the difficult Beaver Ridge to the Parowan Valley, where they camped near Little Salt Lake on October 27. The attempted shortcut had cost them seven days, which would strain their provisions for the rest of the trip. In addition, the sheer size of the group would challenge the capacity of the desert watering holes and pasturelands along the route. Part of the group, led by Captain C. C. Rich and Francis Pomeroy, would break off on October 28 to follow Smith on the Ward route. Rich's group later reunited with Hunt on November 18. 

After Smith and the pack train had left with Ward's map, intending to take the trail themselves, discussion continued.  Everyone agreed that the Ward route would cut off  from their journey so most of the 107 wagons decided to follow Smith's pack train. The party proceeded to a point near present-day Enterprise, Utah in early November, where most of the wagons continued west while a handful turned south to follow the Spanish Trail with Hunt. The Jefferson Hunt Monument was constructed at this location to commemorate the historic split. According to several accounts, just seven wagons followed Hunt south. Those that continued west on Ward's route soon found themselves confronted with the precipitous obstacle of Beaver Dam Wash, described as a gaping canyon on the present-day Utah–Nevada state line (Beaver Dam State Park, Nevada) with  cliff walls. Smith and the pack train had been able to traverse the canyon on foot and hoof, but the wagons could not. The combination of the sheer wall and tough foraging led some to nickname the place "Mount Misery" or "Poverty Point".

Most of the people became discouraged and followed Mr. Rynierson back to join Jefferson Hunt on November 7, and 27 wagons decided to continue on through the wash. The larger portion would reunite with Hunt on December 22. Despite their lack of a reliable map, the smaller group decided to continue, believing that only had to continue west before they would find the pass eventually. A new leader was elected, Jim Martin, and the group continued north to find a way around the canyon; Lee Manly discovered they were backtracking north towards Salt Lake City while he was serving as an advance scout, and he then convinced Martin to turn west. The Martin group was overtaken by a separate all-male group of pioneers calling themselves The Jayhawkers, who continued north but later turned west and joined the Martin group. It took several days to find a route for the wagons around the canyon, after which the group passed through the area of present-day Panaca, Nevada, and crossed over "Bennetts Pass" to Del Mar Valley. Here they started having difficulty finding water but eventually found their way to Crystal Springs in the Pahranagat Valley. They continued over Hancock Summit into Tikaboo Valley  and then on to Groom Lake, now encompassed by Area 51, where they rested and took water.

Second split and Death Valley days
At Groom Lake they again got into a dispute on which way to go. One group, the Bennett-Arcane party, wanted to head south toward the distant, snow-clad Mt. Charleston in hopes of finding a good water source, based on Manly's scouting. The other group—the Jayhawkers—wanted to stay with the original plan of traveling west. The group eventually split and went their separate ways; the Jayhawkers took 20 wagons and the Bennett-Arcanes remained with 7 and Manly. They both were to have two things in common. They were both saved from dying of thirst by a snow storm and they both ended up reuniting at Ash Meadows in the Amargosa Desert of the Amargosa Valley located east of Death Valley. From here they continued on, following the Amargosa River bed to present-day Death Valley Junction, California, and then along the same route followed by current California State Route 190 past the Funeral Mountains.

On Christmas Eve of 1849, the group arrived at Travertine Springs the west-facing canyon of the Amargosa Range, located about a mile from Furnace Creek Wash in Death Valley itself. The lost pioneers had now been traveling across the desert for about two months since leaving the Old Spanish Trail. Their oxen were weak from lack of forage and their wagons were in poor shape. They too were weary and discouraged but their worst problem was not the valley that lay before them. It was the towering Panamint Range mountains to the west that stood like an impenetrable wall as far as could be seen in both directions.

Burnt Wagons (Jayhawkers)
At Furnace Creek, the groups split again. The Jayhawkers decided to head northwest toward a rough pass ("Towne Pass") near present-day Stovepipe Wells, but after discovering it was impassable to wheeled traffic due to strewn boulders, decided to leave their wagons and belongings behind and walk to civilization. They slaughtered several oxen and used the wood of their wagons to cook the meat and make jerky. The place where they did this is today referred to as "Burned Wagons Camp", present day Burnt Wagons, and is located near the sand dunes of Death Valley. From here, they began climbing toward Towne Pass and then turned south over Emigrant Pass to Wildrose Canyon in the Panamint Range. After crossing the mountains and dropping down into Panamint Valley, they turned south and climbed a small pass into Searles Valley, with Searles Lake, before making their way into Indian Wells Valley near present-day Ridgecrest. It was here that they finally got their first look at the Sierra Nevada Mountains. They turned south, probably following a trail and traveled across Fremont Valley, close to the same route followed by current California State Route 14. Ironically, they walked right by Walker Pass, present-day California State Route 178 to Lake Isabella, the mountain pass they had set out to look for almost three months earlier.

Passing by Walker Pass, they entered into what was to become the worst part of their journey, across the Mojave Desert and its Antelope Valley. This is a region with very few water sources to be found. The only things that saved them from dying of thirst were a few puddles of water and ice from a recent storm. Eventually they found their way over a pass in the Sierra Pelona Mountains near Palmdale, and, following the Santa Clara River, were finally discovered and rescued by Mexican Californios cowboys from Rancho Ex-Mission San Fernando, located near present-day Santa Clarita Valley. The Jayhawkers arrived at Rancho San Francisco on February 4, 1850; the survivors later held reunions and celebrated annually on that day from 1872 to 1918.

Long Camp (Bennett-Arcane)

Meanwhile, the Bennett-Arcane group attempted to cross the Panamints to the south at Warm Springs Canyon, where Manly had reported seeing a lake, but failed and retreated to the valley floor. They mistakenly thought the Panamints were the Sierra Nevada and were expecting a quick return. Incredibly, only one of the Bennett-Arcane group had died during the month-long wait at what is now the Bennett-Arcane Long Camp, although several other survivors had left to find their own way out of Death Valley. Reportedly, as the last survivors left with Manly and Rogers, someone proclaimed "Goodbye, Death Valley", naming the area.

Death Valley '49ers nonprofit
The Death Valley '49s were founded in 1949 to commemorate these pioneers with an emphasis on the wagon parties of 1849 and 1850. Each November, the group holds their annual Encampment "to celebrate this pioneer spirit and this special place called Death Valley."

See also
Death Valley
Death Valley National Park
Geology of the Death Valley area
Places of interest in the Death Valley area
History of California through 1899
William L. Manly
John Haney Rogers
Henry Wade Exit Route a 49er
Santa Fe And Salt Lake Trail Monument

References

Notes

Bibliography

External links
Death_Valley_49ers-org: Nonprofit group commemorating The Death Valley '49ers
Death Valley in '49 by William Lewis Manly
Map of the Gold Regions of California, Showing the Routes via Chagres and Panama, Cape Horn, &c.

California Gold Rush
Death Valley
Death Valley National Park
History of Southern California
Mojave Desert
People from Inyo County, California